Qaleh Now-ye Mehdiabad (also Romanized as Qal‘eh Now-ye Mehdīābād; also known as Mahdīābād and Mehdīābād-e Qal‘eh Now) is a village in Darbqazi Rural District, in the Central District of Nishapur County, Razavi Khorasan Province, Iran. At the 2006 census, its population was 249, in 59 families.

References 

Populated places in Nishapur County